Chakpara is a census town in Bally Jagachha CD Block of Howrah Sadar subdivision in Howrah district in the Indian state of West Bengal. It is a part of Kolkata Urban Agglomeration.

Chakpara is under the jurisdiction of Liluah Police Station of Howrah City Police.Various portions of Chakpara are under the Bally Municipal Area.

Geography
It has an average elevation of 14 metres (46 feet).

Demographics
As per 2011 Census of India Chakpara had a total population of 35,282 of which 18,352 (52%) were males and 16,930 (48%) were females. Population below 6 years was 3,623. The total number of literates in Chakpara was 27,897 (88.12% of the population over 6 years).

 India census, Chakpara had a population of 24,212. Males constitute 52% of the population and females 48%. Chakpara has an average literacy rate of 75%, higher than the national average of 59.5%; with male literacy of 79% and female literacy of 70%. 11% of the population is under 6 years of age.

Transport

Bus

Mini Bus
 39 Bhattanagar - Esplanade

Train
Chakpara has a railway station (Bhattanagar Railway station) on its western side. The station is mainly used by Freight trains. No Express train stops here. To avail Local Train, one has to go to Liluah Railway Station, which is the nearest railway station. Tikiapara, Dasnagar and Kona railway stations are also within 5 km from Chakpara. Totos are available from chakpara to tikiapara railway station.

References

Cities and towns in Howrah district
Neighbourhoods in Kolkata
Kolkata Metropolitan Area